City of Ghosts is a hybrid French-American animated/mockumentary streaming television series developed by Elizabeth Ito for Netflix. Co-produced by TeamTO and Netflix Animation, the series premiered on March 5, 2021.

In 2022, the series won a Peabody Award for Children & Youth Programming. Episode 4 of the show references the Tongva homelands of Tovaangar.

Premise
A group of kids, in this hybrid animated mockumentary series, discover stories around Los Angeles by directly communicating with ghosts who inhabit the city.

Characters

Ghost Club
 Zelda (voiced by August Nuñez), a young child and lead detective of the Ghost Club.
 Thomas (voiced by Blue Chapman), a 7-year-old non-binary child who uses they/them pronouns, and member of the Ghost Club. Thomas mentions their pronouns briefly at the beginning of the second episode.
 Eva (voiced by Kirikou S'hai Muldrow), a 5-year-old child and member of the Ghost Club.
 Peter (voiced by Michael Ren), a 6-year-old child and member of the Ghost Club with Eva, Zelda, and Thomas.
 Jasper (voiced by Honor Calderon), a 7-year-old child and member of the Ghost Club with Eva, Zelda, Thomas and Peter. His first appearance is in episode four "Tovangaar", where he is a child who asks the Ghost Club for help and reconnects to his Tongva roots.

Supporting characters
 Chef Jo (voiced by Isa Fabro), a Filipina chef who owns a café in Boyle Heights.
 Mariko (voiced by Kuniko Yagi), friend of Chef Jo who contacts Zelda and asks them for help in tracking down a ghost in the café.
 Jordan (voiced by Angel Chipagua) is Zelda's brother and operates a hand-held camera which records the Ghost Club's activities.
 Janet (voiced by Judy Hayashi), a ghost living in Jo's café.
 Sam (voiced by Teagan Meza), an eight-year-old skateboarder who is spending time with a ghost.
John "JP" P. (voiced by John Pham), the owner of a skate shop in Venice, California, and a friend of Sam.
 Sonya (voiced by Tomeicko Hawkins), owns a vegan café in Leimert Park.
 Jasper (voiced by Honor Calderon), a child who asks the Ghost Club for help and reconnects to his Tongva roots.
 Zelda's Mom (voiced by Sandra Equihua) is the mother of Zelda.
 Nancy Sekizawa (voiced by herself) is a former punk rocker and mother of Zen.
 Yulissa (voiced by Yulissa Maqueos) is a teacher of Oaxacan music, looking for her friend Chepe who communicates with people by whistling.
 Colton (voiced by Gage Fensler)
 Josh "Bagel" Klassman (voiced by himself), a professional skater, surfer, and photographer.
 Aawkut (voiced by L. Frank Manrique) is a ghost in a form of a crow who appears in the episode "Tovaangar".
 Walter (voiced by Adam Muto) 
 Lena (voiced by Gala Parras-Kim)

Episodes

Production
The series was announced by Netflix in May 2019, with Adventure Time writer Elizabeth Ito as showrunner.

The show's backgrounds come from photographs taken by Kwasi Boyd-Bouldin, then painted over at the Los Angeles studio of Chromosphere Studio and the character animation is by the French company, TeamTO. The animation supervisor of TeamTo, Mariah Luna, said that they talked with Ito and Luis Grane, supervising director, of the show, informing their animation. The production manager, Jaimy Nikijuluw, adding that they were often in contact with Ito and Grane until the end of production of each episode. Guillaume Hellouin, president/co-founder of TeamTO said that only a small team worked on the show, one of the smallest they've "ever worked with" while Nikijuluw added they had weekly calls with those at Netflix and Chromosphere Studio.

Release 
The series was released on March 5, 2021 on Netflix. A trailer was released on February 4. Selections from the series will be presented at the San Francisco International Film Festival's Schools at the Festival program in April 2021.

Reception 
The series was positively received. Mashable called the show a "warm, sunny, and soft" and praised the show's pacing, wittiness, humor, and the voice cast. They also said it makes topics like discrimination, cultural appropriation, gentrification and historical erasure understandable for those at a young age. Vulture praised the series as a "lovely and refreshing vision for children’s entertainment" that adults can enjoy which is crafted like a nonfiction production. Wired described the series as "full of big emotional wallops and...narrative specificity" and called it delightful, arguing that it proposes a new way of thinking "about cities, ethnicity, and history," geared toward kids. Wired also called the show a "multicultural melange." The Capital Times called the show "warm and huggable" and for all ages. Los Angeles Times called the series a "gentle love letter" to Los Angeles and the diverse communities within the city, accessible to kids and adults. Animation World Network praised the animation style and background, saying the latter has "the aesthetic of a pop-up book." The New York Times recommended the series to fans of Bluey, Molly of Denali, NPR podcasts and Vida.

The series got nominated for 4 Children's and Family Emmy Awards including Outstanding Animated Series at the 1st Children's and Family Emmy Awards and won 2 awards for Outstanding Directing for an Animated Program and Outstanding Animated Series.

References

External links
 
 

2021 American television series debuts
2021 American television series endings
2020s American animated television series
2020s American mockumentary television series
2021 French television series debuts
2021 French television series endings
2020s French animated television series
American children's animated comedy television series
American children's animated fantasy television series
American computer-animated television series
Animated television series about children
Animated television series about ghosts
English-language Netflix original programming
French children's animated comedy television series
French children's animated fantasy television series
French computer-animated television series
2020s American LGBT-related animated television series
Netflix children's programming
Television series by Netflix Animation
Television shows set in Los Angeles
Peabody Award-winning television programs